is a Japanese rugby union player who plays as a Flanker. He currently plays for Suntory Sungoliath in Japan's domestic Top League.

International
Ozawa was called-up to his country's wider training squad in April 2021, ahead of British and Irish Lions test. On 24 May, he was named in the 36-man squad for the match against the Sunwolves and tour of Scotland and Ireland. He had previously won 4 caps for his country in 2017, debuting against Korea in the opening match of the 2017 Asia Rugby Championship.

References

External Links
itsrugby.co.uk Profile
ESPN Rugby Profile

1988 births
Living people
Japanese rugby union players
Rugby union flankers
Tokyo Sungoliath players
Japan international rugby union players
21st-century Japanese people